The Kung Fu Master is a 2020 Indian Malayalam-language martial arts film written and directed by Abrid Shine, produced by Shibu Thekkumpuram under the banner of Fullon Studio Frames. The film stars Neeta Pillai, Sanoop Dinesh and Jiji Scaria in major roles. The music and background score of the film was composed by Ishaan Chhabra. Arjun Ravi, actor-director Major Ravi's son made his debut as a cinematographer with this film.

Plot 
Rishi Ram and his sister Rithu Ram are martial arts instructors settled in Rishikesh. They are leading a peaceful life, but Rishi becomes the target of a notorious martial arts gang after he turns police informer. After surviving an attack from the gang of criminals, Rishi and his sister Rithu sets out to hunt down the gang.

Cast 
 Neeta Pillai as Rithu Ram
 Jiji Scaria as Rishi Ram
 Sanoop Dinesh as Louis Antony
 Sooraj S. Kurup as Naveen
 Anju Balachandran as Anu
 Sonet Jose as Killer Jenson

Production 
The film was shot at Himalayan Valley, Badrinath and India-China border. Its martial arts sequences were influenced by the action films of Bruce Lee, Jackie Chan and Jet Li. Lead actress Neeta Pillai trained Kung fu for a year to do action scenes in the film.

Soundtrack 
The music and background score was composed by Ishaan Chhabra, and the lyrics for the songs were written by Sreerekha Bhaskaran.

Release 
The film was released on 24 January 2020. Neeta Pillai's and Sanoop's performance were praised, though, with many praising the efforts they took.

References

External links 
 
 The Kung Fu Master on m3db

2020 films
2020s Malayalam-language films
Indian martial arts films
Indian action films
2020 martial arts films
Films directed by Abrid Shine